La Bastide-de-Bousignac is a commune in the Ariège department in the Occitanie region of south-western France.

The inhabitants of the commune are known as Bousignacois or Bousignacoises.

Geography
La Bastide-de-Bousignac is located just 3 km south of Mirepoix and 2 km north of Saint-Quentin-la-Tour. Access to the commune is by the D625 road from Mirepoix which passes through the centre of the commune and the village and continues south to Saint-Quentin-la-Tour. The D7 goes east from the village to Lagarde. The D7A goes south-west from the village to Saint-Julien-de-Gras-Capou. The D78 comes from Saint-Julien-de-Gras-Capou in the south and passes north through the western arm of the commune continuing to join the D13 south of Besset. The commune is mixed farmland and forest.

The Countirou river flows from the south through the centre of the commune and the village and continues north to join the Hers at Mirepoix. The Ruisseau de Gradal rises in the east of the commune and flows west to join the Countirou north of the village. The Ruisseau de Mazeroles flows through the western arm of the commune from south to north continuing north to join the Hers at Besset.

History
La Bastide-de-Bousignac appears as la Baftide de Bouzujnac on the 1750 Cassini Map and as la Baftide on the 1790 version.

Administration

List of Successive Mayors

In February 2013 Roger Senie announces he would not stand in 2014. In July 2013 he was reelected mayor after resigning in protest against the forced inclusion of La Bastide-de-Bousignac into the community of communes of the Pays de Mirepoix. Serving from 1947 to 2014, he was the oldest mayor in France equally with Arthur Richier, the mayor of Faucon-du-Caire in Alpes-de-Haute-Provence. who, like him, did not stand in March 2014.

Demography
In 2017 the commune had 338 inhabitants.

Culture and heritage

Religious heritage

The Church Bell (Middle Ages) is registered as an historical monument.

Notable people linked to the commune
 Pierre Espert de Sibra (1771-1835), General of the armies of the Republic and the Empire, died in the hamlet of Balach.
 Roger Sénié (born in 1921), Mayor of the commune from 1947 to 2014

See also
Communes of the Ariège department

References

Communes of Ariège (department)